So You Think You Can Dance, also known as SYTYCD, is a United States television reality program and dance competition airing on the Fox Broadcasting Company network. Season six premiered on Wednesday, September 9, 2009, with Nigel Lythgoe and Mary Murphy returning as permanent judges and Cat Deeley returning to host. Season six is the show's only season to air during the fall season, immediately following the summer airing of season five. Live shows began airing October 26 and the season finale aired on December 16. Russell Ferguson, the first krumper to make it to the Las Vegas auditions, won the title of "America's Favorite Dancer" in first place and the $250,000 prize. Also in the finale were Jakob Karr in second place, Kathryn McCormick in third place, Ellenore Scott in fourth place, Ashleigh Di Lello in fifth place and Ryan Di Lello in sixth place.

This season is also noteworthy for featuring Ariana DeBose who, despite being amongst the first contestants eliminated, would later go on to win the Academy Award for Best Supporting Actress for her performance as Anita in the Steven Spielberg remake of West Side Story.

Auditions

Locations
Open auditions for this season somewhat overlapped season 5. These auditions for season 6 were held in the following cities after season 5's Las Vegas week, but before season 5's finals started:

Lythgoe was accepting an honorary degree from the University of Bedfordshire; therefore, two guest judges were present.

Las Vegas week 
Judges: Nigel Lythgoe, Mary Murphy, Adam Shankman, Mia Michaels, Tyce Diorio, Debbie Allen

The Las Vegas callbacks were held at Planet Hollywood Resort and Casino in Las Vegas, Nevada. 152 dancers were invited to participate in the callback auditions. This number was cut to 38 dancers, before the announcement of the season's top 20 contestants. Las Vegas week included the following rounds, with cuts made after each:

Top 20 Contestants

Female Contestants

Male Contestants 

 Dumlao replaced original Top 20 dancer Billy Bell, who had to withdraw from the competition due to illness.

Finals

Elimination chart
The elimination song for the women playing during the montage was "Never Say Never" by The Fray. The elimination song for the men playing during the montage was "Where It Ends" by 16 Frames.

The show was unable to schedule full performance and results shows for the first two weeks due to conflicts with the World Series.
 These female dancers were barred from performing their routines. See below for more information.

Performance nights
Due to network conflicts with the World Series, the show was unable to schedule a separate results show for the first two weeks. As a result, no public voting was held on those occasions; after the couples' performances, the judges alone selected four dancers to perform solos, and subsequently eliminated two.

The standard format of a performance show followed by voting, with a results show the following night, resumed for the third week of competition.

Week 1 (October 26, 2009)

"Meet the Top 20"
Performances:

Performance show
Top 20 Couple dances:

Noelle Marsh did not perform on the show due to injury. She would become Ferguson's partner in Week 2.

Bottom 4 dancers' solos:

Eliminated:
Ariana DeBose
Brandon Dumlao
New partners:
Pauline Mata and Peter Sabasino

Week 2 (November 3, 2009)
Top 18 Couple dances:

Bottom 4 dancers' solos:

Eliminated:
Bianca Revels
Phillip Atmore
New partners:
Channing Cooke and Victor Smalley

Week 3 (November 10, 2009)
Top 16 Couple dances:

Week 4 (November 17, 2009)
Top 14 Couple dances:

Week 5 (November 24, 2009)
Top 12 Couple dances:

Week 6 (December 1, 2009)
Top 10 Couple dances:

Solos:

Week 7 (December 8, 2009)
Top 8 Couple dances:

Solos:

 Ashleigh Di Lello was paired with Russell Ferguson, but dislocated her shoulder during rehearsal of their Bollywood number and was barred from performing by doctors. As a result, she did not perform a solo and Ferguson danced their two numbers with the choreographers' assistants, Alysha Shroff. Voting for Di Lello was still opened; viewers were urged to consider her previous performances and rehearsal footage in making their choice in voting for her.

Week 8 (December 15, 2009)
Top 6 Couple dances:

Result shows

Week 3 (November 11, 2009)
Group dance: Top 16: "Warrior, Pt. 2"—Lloyd Banks (Hip-Hop; Choreographer: Dave Scott)
Guest dancers: Alvin Ailey American Dance Theater: "Episodes"—Ulysses Dove (Contemporary Ballet; Choreographer: Ulysses Dove)
Bottom 3's solos:

 Sabasino chose to dance a cappella.

Eliminated:
Pauline Mata
Peter Sabasino
New partners:
None

Week 4 (November 18, 2009)
Group dance: Top 14: "Aha!"—Imogen Heap (Contemporary Jazz; Choreographer: Wade Robson, co-conceived with Amanda Robson)
Musical guest: "According to You"—Orianthi
Guest dancers: Nakul Dev Mahajan and NDM Bollywood Dance Productions: "Desi Girl" from Dostana (Bollywood; Choreographer: Nakul Dev Mahajan)
Bottom 3's solos:

Eliminated:
Channing Cooke
Kevin Hunte
New partners:
Karen Hauer and Victor Smalley

Week 5 (November 25, 2009)
Group dance: Top 12: "What's a Girl Gotta Do"–Basement Jaxx feat. Paloma Faith (Pop-Jazz; Choreographer: Napoleon and Tabitha D'umo)
Musical guest: "Give It Up To Me"–Shakira
Guest dancer(s): Paloma Herrera: Don Quixote: Kitri's Variation (The Fan) - Ludwig Minkus (Ballet; Choreographer: Paloma Herrera)
Bottom 3's solos:

Eliminated:
Karen Hauer
Victor Smalley
New partners:
None. Now that only 10 dancers remain, partners are randomly assigned each week and the top 10 will be voted individually.

Week 6 (December 2, 2009)
Group dance: Top 10: "It's Still Rock and Roll to Me"—Billy Joel (Broadway; Choreographer: Tyce Diorio)
Musical guest: "I Wanna Rock"—Snoop Dogg (featuring Quest Crew and The Ranger$)
Guest dancer(s): The Legion of Extraordinary Dancers: "Yellow"—Vitamin String Quartet (Hip-Hop;  Choreographer: Harry Shum, Jr., Christopher Scott, and Galen Hooks)
Bottom 4's Solos:

 Eliminated:
 Noelle Marsh
 Nathan Trasoras

Week 7 (December 9, 2009)
Group dance: Top 8: "Pon de Floor" (Samantha Ronson remix)—Major Lazer feat. Vybz Kartel (Jazz; Choreographer: Sonya Tayeh)
Musical guests:
"Nobody"—Wonder Girls
"Live Like We're Dying"—Kris Allen
Bottom 4's solos:

Week 8 (Finale) (December 16, 2009)
Judges: Lil' C, Tyce Diorio, Debbie Allen, Adam Shankman, Mary Murphy, Nigel Lythgoe
Musical Guests:
"I See You"—Leona Lewis
"Whataya Want from Me"—Adam Lambert
"I Am"—Mary J. Blige
"Louboutins"—Jennifer Lopez
Guest dancers The Groovaloos ("Groovaloo Street"—Rapier & Burns)
Group dances:

Judges' picks

 As Ferguson injured himself performing in the first Judge's Pick routine, the noted subsequent routines were shown pre-recorded rather than newly performed live.

6th Place
Ryan Di Lello
5th Place
Ashleigh Di Lello
4th Place
Ellenore Scott
3rd Place
Kathryn McCormick
Runner-up
Jakob Karr
Winner
Russell Ferguson

Promotion
As a result of the auditions for season 6 taking place concurrently with the airing of season 5, increased promotion was possible. A Deeley voice-over at the end of the fifth season's audition episodes sent viewers to the official website for more information about auditioning for the fall season. The judges' travels to various cities were also mentioned if the audition weekend followed a results show. A video segment of Ryan Kasprzak, brother of top 20 contestant Evan Kasprzak and fellow auditioner for season 5, aired during the summer's top 18 results show. It showed him auditioning for season 6 in Los Angeles and making it to the Las Vegas round. Nigel Lythgoe also mentioned him in the finale of season 5, stating that there will be "more Kasprzak in the fall." Since then, however, it was announced Kasprzak was eliminated after the ballroom round of Vegas week.

Foreign broadcast
Unlike previous seasons, much of season 6 was not simulcast on Canadian network CTV, due to conflicts with their fall schedule. As a result, CTV's sister network 'A' aired the series from its start until the end of November, with CTV resuming with the Top 10 week on December 1. Norwegian channel TVNorge will air the show in performance and results shows, and shows all routines, as it did in season 5. In South Africa the season is set to premier in February. AXN Asia also aired this season just after the season 4 ended airing in January 2010.

Australia finally airs this season since the fifth season back in 2009 on Network Ten. This season premiered on January 15, 2011, on the new channel Eleven.

Special performance episode
On October 26, 2009, Fox aired a special episode introducing viewers to the Top 20 contestants of season 6 dancing in their own styles. Contemporary dancer Billy Bell appeared in the special before having to withdraw due to illness.

Changes
Besides not starting results shows until the Top 16, this will be the first season where the finale will occur at the Top 6 stage, rather than the usual Top 4. This is most likely due to the show producers and network not wishing to continue airing through the week of Christmas, due to the special performance show.

Ratings

U.S. Nielsen ratings

See also
 List of So You Think You Can Dance finalists

References

External links
 Official "So You Think You Can Dance" Website
 Official "So You Think You Can Dance" Facebook Fan Page

2009 American television seasons
Season 06